Teton Pass Ski Area is an alpine ski area  located along the Rocky Mountain Front in northwestern Montana, west of Choteau, Montana and east of the Continental Divide. Formerly known as Rocky Mountain Hi in the 1990s, it was bought by New Zealand native Nick Wood in July 2010.

For the 2011–12 season, the resort was unable to obtain insurance and thus did not open its facilities. The resort closed again in 2017 and remained so until 2019 when it was purchased by its former manager and Choteau resident, Charles Hlavac. Initially listed for $3,000,000, it eventually sold for just $345,000.

References

External links
 Teton Pass Resort.com – official site
 Montana Ski Resorts.com – Teton Pass
 Big Sky Fishing.com – photos – Teton Pass ski area
 Ski MT.com – official state site – Teton Pass

Ski areas and resorts in Montana
Buildings and structures in Teton County, Montana
Tourist attractions in Teton County, Montana